James Alfred Palmer Jr. (born July 31, 1996) is an American professional basketball player for JL Bourg of the French LNB Pro A. He played college basketball for the Nebraska Cornhuskers.

High school career
Palmer started his freshman year at St. John's College High School in Washington, DC. After his freshman year, he transferred to Dr. Henry A. Wise High School in Upper Marlboro, Maryland. After attending his sophomore year at Wise HS he was recruited back to St. John's by new coach Sean McAloon, where he continued his junior and senior year. As a senior, he averaged 15.7 points, 3.0 rebounds, and 2.1 assists per game as he led his team to a 27-4 record and an appearance in D.C. State Athletic Association semifinal. For his efforts, he earned first-team all-conference in the highly-competitive Washington Catholic Athletic Conference. Palmer played summer ball for Team Takeover, one of the top AAU teams in the region.

Recruiting
Palmer was ranked in the top 100 players in the class of 2014 by both Scout and Rivals. He was ranked the number one player in the D.C. region by ESPN. Palmer committed to Miami on August 5, 2013.

College career

Freshman
Palmer started five of 38 games played in the 2014-2015 season, averaging 3.7 points, 1.4 rebounds in 13.3 minutes per game.

Sophomore
Palmer played in 34 of 35 games in the 2015-2016 season, averaging 3.4 points, 1.1 rebounds, 0.7 assists and 0.4 steals in 11.6 minutes per game. In the Sweet Sixteen of the NCAA Tournament, he scored six points against eventual national champion Villanova. 

On May 17, 2016, Palmer transferred to Nebraska.

Junior
After transferring from Miami, Palmer became the go-to scoring option at Nebraska and led the team to a 22-win season and NIT appearance. He averaged 17.2 points, 4.4 rebounds and 3.0 assists per game. 

Following the season, Palmer declared for the 2018 NBA draft but did not hire an agent. On May 26, he announced he was returning to the Cornhuskers.

Senior
As a senior, Palmer averaged 19.7 points, 4.2 rebounds, 3.0 assists and 1.4 steals per game. He set school single-season records for points (708), free throws made (215) and minutes played (1,269). Palmer was named to the Third Team All-Big Ten.

Professional career
Palmer was not selected in the 2019 NBA Draft but was signed by the Phoenix Suns for the 2019 NBA Summer League.

Palmer signed an Exhibit 10 training camp deal in August 2019 with the Los Angeles Clippers before being waived in October. This deal eventually resulted in him playing for the Agua Caliente Clippers for the 2019–20 NBA G League season. In his first game with the Clippers, Palmer scored 40 points on 15-of-19 shooting to go with five rebounds in a 121-120 win over the Northern Arizona Suns. He averaged 19.1 points, 2.7 assists, and 4.0 rebounds per game during the 2019-20 season. During the 2020-21 season, Palmer averaged 16.7 points, 4.8 rebounds and 2.8 assists per game.

On July 19, 2021, he signed with Stal Ostrów Wielkopolski of the Polish Basketball League for the entire season. On February 24, 2022, his NBA G League rights were traded from the Agua Caliente Clippers to the Cleveland Charge, in exchange for Trevon Scott.

On June 29, 2022, he has signed with JL Bourg of the French LNB Pro A.

Career statistics

College

|-
| style="text-align:left;"| 2014–15
| style="text-align:left;"| Miami
| 38 || 5 || 13.3 || .413 || .365 || .652 || 1.4 || .7 || .1 || .2 || 3.7
|-
| style="text-align:left;"| 2015–16
| style="text-align:left;"| Miami
| 34 || 0 || 11.6 || .364 || .277 || .676 || 1.1 || .7 || .4 || .1 || 3.4
|-
| style="text-align:left;"| 2016–17
| style="text-align:left;"| Nebraska
| style="text-align:center;" colspan="11"|  Redshirt
|-
| style="text-align:left;"| 2017–18
| style="text-align:left;"| Nebraska
| 33 || 33 || 31.0 || .444 || .309 || .738 || 4.4 || 3.0 || 1.0 || .5 || 17.2
|-
| style="text-align:left;"| 2018–19
| style="text-align:left;"| Nebraska
| 36 || 36 || 35.2 || .369 || .313 || .762 || 4.2 || 3.0 || 1.4 || .4 || 19.7
|- class="sortbottom"
| style="text-align:center;" colspan="2"| Career
| 141 || 74 || 22.6 || .398 || .315 || .742 || 2.7 || 1.8 || .7 || .3 || 10.9

Personal life
Palmer was born in Washington, D.C. and is the son of Demetra McFadden and the late James Palmer, Sr. His father died on May 29, 2009. Palmer has one sister, Tijisha, and one brother, Tijree.

References

External links
Nebraska Cornhuskers bio
Sports-Reference.com profile
ESPN.com profile

1996 births
Living people
Agua Caliente Clippers players
American men's basketball players
Basketball players from Washington, D.C.
JL Bourg-en-Bresse players
Miami Hurricanes men's basketball players
Nebraska Cornhuskers men's basketball players
Shooting guards
Stal Ostrów Wielkopolski players